Sridevi Vijaykumar is an Indian actress. Starting off as a child artist in the 1992 Tamil film Rickshaw Mama, she has appeared in Tamil, Telugu and Kannada films. She became a leading actress from the 2000s.

Personal life 
Sridevi was born as the youngest daughter of Tamil actor Vijayakumar and Manjula, a popular South Indian actress. Sridevi has two elder sisters, Vanitha and Preetha, two half-sisters, Kavitha and Anitha, and an elder half-brother, Arun Vijay.

She is married to Rahul and has a daughter.

Film career
She started off as a child artist in a Tamil movie Rickshaw Mama. Sridevi made her Tamil debut as heroine in the romantic film Kadhal Virus by Kathir. She shifted to Telugu industry and became popular. She was critically acclaimed for her performance in AVM's Priyamana Thozhi by Vikraman.

Filmography

Films

Television

References

External links 
 

Living people
Year of birth missing (living people)
Actresses from Tamil Nadu
Indian film actresses
Tamil actresses
Actresses in Tamil cinema
Actresses in Telugu cinema
Actresses in Kannada cinema
Indian child actresses
21st-century Indian women
20th-century Indian actresses
21st-century Indian actresses